The following events occurred in March 1926:

Monday, March 1, 1926

Washington Luís won the Brazilian presidential election with 98% of the vote.
The film Dancing Mothers was released.
Born: Pete Rozelle, NFL commissioner, in South Gate, California (d. 1996); and Allen Stanley, hockey player, in Timmins, Ontario, Canada (d. 2013)

Tuesday, March 2, 1926
German Chancellor Hans Luther gave a nationally broadcast speech in which he stated that Germany's entry into the League of Nations was understood to be contingent on no other changes being made to the League's membership council. "All Germany's debates on whether it should enter the League now were based on a contemplation of the League as it existed when Germany was asked to join. Therefore, it is illogical to try to combine Germany's entry into the League with changes in the membership of the council." Germany was displeased about the prospect of a temporary council seat being granted to Poland, a country Germany considered hostile.
Born: Murray Rothbard, economist, in The Bronx, New York (d. 1995)

Wednesday, March 3, 1926
Germany and Afghanistan concluded a friendship agreement.
Born: James Merrill, poet, in New York City (d. 1995)

Thursday, March 4, 1926
Zizi Lambrino filed a lawsuit in Paris against Prince Carol of Romania for 10 million francs, asserting that she was still legally Carol's wife and entitled to money to support herself and their son Carol Lambrino.
A strange story, sometimes thought to be an urban legend, was reported in the Hungarian newspaper Az Est, concerning a waiter in Budapest who committed suicide and left behind a note containing a complex crossword puzzle as some kind of clue. It does not appear that the mystery was ever solved.
Born: Richard DeVos, businessman, in Grand Rapids, Michigan (d. 2018); and Fran Warren, popular singer, in The Bronx, New York (d. 2013)

Friday, March 5, 1926

The first issue of science fiction magazine Amazing Stories arrived on newsstands, with a cover date of April 1926.
Ivar Lykke became Prime Minister of Norway.

Saturday, March 6, 1926
In France, the Cabinet of Aristide Briand fell after failing to pass a financial bill.
The Shakespeare Memorial Theatre in Stratford-upon-Avon was destroyed by fire.
Born: 
Alan Greenspan, economist, in Washington Heights, Manhattan, New York
Andrzej Wajda, film director, in Suwałki, Poland (d. 2016)

Sunday, March 7, 1926
A meeting in Geneva among the signatories of the Locarno Treaties agreed that Germany's entry into the League of Nations would be delayed pending the formation of a new French government and a decision regarding permanent council seats for Poland, Spain and Brazil.
The first commercial trans-Atlantic telephone call was made from New York to London. 
The Argentine legislative election was won by the Radical Civic Union.

Monday, March 8, 1926

Dirk Jan de Geer became Prime Minister of the Netherlands.
Born: Sultan Salahuddin of Selangor, in Kuala Langat, Malaysia (d. 2001)

Tuesday, March 9, 1926
Aristide Briand formed a new Cabinet.
The Italian historical film The Last Days of Pompeii was released.
Born: Neill Armstrong, American football player and coach, in Tishomingo, Oklahoma (d. 2016)
Died: Mikao Usui, 60, Japanese founder of the spiritual practice of Reiki

Wednesday, March 10, 1926
Asano, Bentembashi and Musashi-Shiraishi Stations opened on the privately held Tsurumi Rinko in Japan, initially for freight operations only.
Born: Barbara Howard, artist, in Long Branch, Ontario, Canada (d. 2002)

Thursday, March 11, 1926
Legislation was passed in Italy banning all non-Fascist labor unions and effectively removing the right to strike. 
Born: Derek Benfield, playwright and actor, in Bradford, West Riding of Yorkshire, England (d. 2009)

Friday, March 12, 1926
The Savoy Ballroom opened in Harlem.
Two Japanese destroyers came under fire from the Taku Forts. A captain died of injuries and 2 other sailors were wounded.
Died: E. W. Scripps, 71, American newspaper publisher

Saturday, March 13, 1926
Born: Carlos Roberto Reina, President of Honduras, in Comayagüela (d. 2003)

Sunday, March 14, 1926

The El Virilla train accident killed 248 and wounded 93 in Costa Rica.
The Roland West mystery melodrama film The Bat was released.

Monday, March 15, 1926
Five Fascists went on trial for the 1924 murder of Socialist politician Giacomo Matteotti. The trial took place in the largely inaccessible coastal town of Chieti and the judge was the brother-in-law of the prominent Fascist politician Roberto Farinacci.
Japan demanded a formal apology and an indemnity payment from China over the March 12 incident. The signatories to the Boxer Protocol also gave China an ultimatum to dismantle the Taku Forts and allow unimpeded access to the sea.
Born: Norm Van Brocklin, American football player, in Eagle Butte, South Dakota (d. 1983)

Tuesday, March 16, 1926
Robert Goddard launched the first liquid-fuel rocket at Auburn, Massachusetts. This was considered by some to be the start of the space age, although his rocket did not reach outer space.

Born: Charles Goodell, politician, in Jamestown, New York (d. 1987); and Jerry Lewis, comedian and filmmaker, in Newark, New Jersey (d. 2017)
Died: Sergeant Stubby, World War I American hero  war dog

Wednesday, March 17, 1926
Germany's admission into the League of Nations was delayed again over complications raised by Brazil and Spain regarding the allocation of permanent council seats.
Feng Yuxiang's Guominjun troops at Dagu Fort near Tianjin exchanged fire with Japanese warships carrying Zhang Zuolin's Fengtian troops.
Richard Rodgers' musical comedy play The Girl Friend opens on Broadway.
Born: Jaynne Bittner, baseball player, in Lebanon, Pennsylvania (d. 2017); and Siegfried Lenz, writer, in Ełk, East Prussia (d. 2014)
Died: Aleksei Brusilov, 72, Russian general

Thursday, March 18, 1926

The March 18 Massacre took place in Beijing. Government troops and police shot 47 unarmed demonstrators who were protesting unequal treaties with foreign powers and their March 15 ultimatum.
Born: Peter Graves, actor, in Minneapolis, Minnesota (d. 2010)
Died: John Calvin Coolidge, Sr., 80, U.S. politician and father of President Calvin Coolidge

Friday, March 19, 1926
Main-asteroid belt 2732 Witt was discovered in Heidelberg by astronomer Max Wolf.
Died: Bill Hutchinson, 66, baseball player

Saturday, March 20, 1926
The Zhongshan Warship Incident took place; a suspected kidnapping plot against Chiang Kai-shek was foiled.

Sunday, March 21, 1926
The comedy film Tramp, Tramp, Tramp opened.
Died: Oswald Herbert Ernst, 83, American astronomer, engineer and military officer

Monday, March 22, 1926
A one-way traffic system came into effect at Hyde Park Corner in London.
The German drama film The Brothers Schellenberg premiered at the Ufa-Palast am Zoo in Berlin.

Tuesday, March 23, 1926
Cushman Dam in Mason County, Washington, was formally activated with the push of a button by Calvin Coolidge at the White House.

Wednesday, March 24, 1926
The Matteotti murder trial ended with two Fascists acquitted and the other three sentenced to six years in prison for "unintentional murder". However, in consideration of time served and an amnesty law passed by the government the previous year for any political murders arising from "unforeseen circumstances", all were set to be freed in seven weeks except for ringleader Amerigo Dumini, who received an additional six months.
A national appeal to rebuild the Shakespeare Memorial Theatre was launched in England.
Born: Dario Fo, Italian author and Nobel Prize laureate, in Leggiuno Sangiano, Italy (d. 2016); and Ventsislav Yankov, Bulgarian pianist (d. 2022)
Died: Sizzo, Prince of Schwarzburg, 65

Thursday, March 25, 1926
Carrozzeria Touring was established in Milan.
Born: Gene Shalit, American film critic, in New York City
László Papp, Hungarian boxer, in Budapest (d. 2003)

Friday, March 26, 1926
The French franc tumbled to 29.15 to the American dollar, the lowest in the currency's history, as a devaluation crisis began to develop in France.
The Polish and Romanian governments signed a Treaty of Alliance to bolster security in Eastern Europe.
Died: Constantin Fehrenbach, 74, Chancellor of Germany

Saturday, March 27, 1926
The Kōnan Railway Company was founded in Japan.
Died: Georges Vézina, 39, hockey player

Sunday, March 28, 1926
Police fought rioters in Paris resulting from the election of two communists to the Chamber of Deputies.
Born: Cayetana Fitz-James Stuart, 18th Duchess of Alba, aristocrat, at Liria Palace in Madrid, Spain (d. 2014)

Monday, March 29, 1926
The U.S. government granted permission for two breweries to make 3.76% "malt tonic" to be sold through drug stores without prescription for a six-month trial period.

Tuesday, March 30, 1926
Alexandru Averescu became Prime Minister of Romania for the third time.
Roberto Farinacci resigned as National Secretary of the Fascist Party of Italy. He practiced private law until returning to public prominence by joining the Grand Council in 1935. 
France shipped out 340 convicts, with another 340 to be picked up in Algiers, on a boat bound for Devil's Island. The government had previously committed to winding down and closing the nefarious colonial prison, but it abandoned the pledge due to jail overcrowding.
Born: Ingvar Kamprad, businessman, in Älmhult, Sweden (d. 2018); and Peter Marshall, singer and television host, in Huntington, West Virginia (Alive in 2021)

Wednesday, March 31, 1926
The Italian Senate was completely reorganized into a syndicalist body.
Born: John Fowles, writer, in Leigh-on-Sea, England (d. 2005)

References

1926
1926-03
1926-03